Truffade is a rural dish traditionally associated with Auvergne in France.  It is a sort of thick pancake made with thinly sliced potatoes that are slowly cooked in goose fat until tender, then mixed with thin strips of tome fraîche (which is very different from actual tomme cheese: the recipe will fail if tomme cheese is used, since that melts in a very different way). This mixture is stirred until it sticks together in a sort of thick pastry, which is sometimes decorated with fresh parsley and may be served with a simple green salad.

Sometimes the truffade is flipped over to brown the other side, or lardons are added to it.

See also
Aligot
Patranque
Pachade
Auvergne
Cheese

References

French cuisine
Potato dishes